In biomolecular structure, CING stands for the Common Interface for NMR structure Generation and is known for structure and NMR data validation.

NMR spectroscopy provides diverse data on the solution structure of biomolecules. CING combines many external programs and internalized algorithms to direct an author of a new structure or a biochemist interested in an existing structure to regions of the molecule that might be problematic in relation to the experimental data.

The source code is maintained open to the public at Google Code.  There is a secure web interface iCing available for new data.

Applications 
 9000+ validation reports for existing Protein Data Bank structures in NRG-CING.
 CING has been applied to automatic predictions in the CASD-NMR  experiment with results available at CASD-NMR.

Validated NMR data 
 Protein or Nucleic acid structure together called Biomolecular structure
 Chemical shift
 (Nuclear Overhauser effect) Distance restraint
 Dihedral angle restraint
 RDC or Residual dipolar coupling restraint
 NMR (cross-)peak

Software 

Following software is used internally or externally by CING:

 3DNA 
 Collaborative Computing Project for NMR
 CYANA (Software)
 DSSP (algorithm)
 MOLMOL 
 Matplotlib
 Nmrpipe
 PROCHECK/Aqua 
 POV-Ray
 ShiftX 
 TALOS+ 
 WHAT_CHECK 
 Wattos 
 XPLOR-NIH
 Yasara

Algorithms
 Saltbridge 
 Disulfide bridge 
 Outlier

Funding 
The NRG-CING project was supported by the European Community grants 213010 (eNMR) and 261572 (WeNMR).

References

External links
 CING - includes tutorials and blog.
 iCing - web interface to CING.
 software - Google code with issue tracker and Wiki.
 NRG-CING - validation results on all PDB NMR structures.
 CASD-NMR CING - validation results of recent CASD-NMR predicted structures.

Protein structure